

597001–597100 

|-bgcolor=#f2f2f2
| colspan=4 align=center | 
|}

597101–597200 

|-id=148
| 597148 Chungmingshan ||  || Ming-Shan Chung (born 1956), the director of Yushan National Park in Taiwan, who has devoted himself to the development of the National parks of Taiwan for several decades. || +
|}

597201–597300 

|-bgcolor=#f2f2f2
| colspan=4 align=center | 
|}

597301–597400 

|-bgcolor=#f2f2f2
| colspan=4 align=center | 
|}

597401–597500 

|-bgcolor=#f2f2f2
| colspan=4 align=center | 
|}

597501–597600 

|-bgcolor=#f2f2f2
| colspan=4 align=center | 
|}

597601–597700 

|-bgcolor=#f2f2f2
| colspan=4 align=center | 
|}

597701–597800 

|-bgcolor=#f2f2f2
| colspan=4 align=center | 
|}

597801–597900 

|-bgcolor=#f2f2f2
| colspan=4 align=center | 
|}

597901–598000 

|-bgcolor=#f2f2f2
| colspan=4 align=center | 
|}

References 

597001-598000